Essen-Dellwig Ost is a railway station in Essen, North Rhine-Westphalia, Germany. The station is located on the Essen–Bottrop railway and is served by S-Bahn services operated by DB. The station is located 300m away from Essen-Dellwig station.

References

S9 (Rhine-Ruhr S-Bahn)
Rhine-Ruhr S-Bahn stations
Dellwig Ost